The 2013–14 Texas State Bobcats men's basketball team represents Texas State University–San Marcos during the 2013–14 NCAA Division I women's basketball season. The Bobcats, led by third year head coach Zenrae Antoine, play their home games at Strahan Coliseum and are first year members of the Sun Belt Conference.

Roster

Schedule

|-
!colspan=9| Regular Season

|-
!colspan=9| 2014 Sun Belt Tournament

|-
!colspan=9| 2014 Women's Basketball Invitational

See also
2013–14 Texas State Bobcats men's basketball team

References

Texas State Bobcats women's basketball seasons
Texas State
Texas State Bobcats basketball
Texas State Bobcats basketball